Cradock Historic District is a national historic district located at Portsmouth, Virginia. It encompasses 759 contributing buildings and 1 contributing structure in a primarily residential section of Portsmouth.  It was developed starting in 1918, as a planned community of Colonial Revival and Bungalow style single family residences.  It was developed by the United States Housing Corporation as a result of the rapid influx of workers at the Norfolk Naval Shipyard during World War I.

It was listed on the National Register of Historic Places in 1974.

References

Historic districts on the National Register of Historic Places in Virginia
Colonial Revival architecture in Virginia
Buildings and structures in Portsmouth, Virginia
National Register of Historic Places in Portsmouth, Virginia